This is a list of workhouses in London.  In 1776 there were 86 workhouses in the metropolis plus about 12 pauper farms in Hoxton and Mile End

 Aldgate workhouse
 Bethnal Green workhouse
 Bow workhouse
 Camberwell workhouse
 Chelsea workhouse
 Christchurch workhouse
 City of London workhouse
 Clapham workhouse
 Clerkenwell workhouse
 Cripplegate workhouse
 Forest Gate workhouse
 Fulham workhouse
 Greenwich workhouse
 Hackney workhouse
 Hampstead workhouse
 Hanwell workhouse
 Holborn workhouse
 Islington workhouse
 Kensington workhouse
 Lambeth workhouse
 Lewisham workhouse
 Mile End Old Town workhouse
 Newington workhouse
 Poplar workhouse
 Saffron Hill workhouse
 Shoreditch workhouse
 Southwark workhouse
 St Andrew, Holborn workhouse
 St Ann's, Limehouse workhouse
 St George in the East workhouse
 St George, Hanover Square workhouse
 St George-the-Martyr workhouse
 St Giles & St George workhouse
 St Giles, Cripplegate workhouse
 St Luke workhouse
 St Margaret & St John, Westminster workhouse
 St Martin-in-the-Fields workhouse
 St Marylebone workhouse
 St Olave's Poor Law Union workhouse, Rotherhithe
 St Pancras workhouse
 St Paul, Covent Garden workhouse
 St Saviour's workhouse
 Stepney workhouse
 Strand workhouse
 Tooting workhouse
 Training Ship Goliath workhouse
 Wandsworth and Clapham workhouse
 Wapping workhouse
 West London workhouse
 Westminster workhouse
 Whitechapel workhouse

References

 
18th century in London
19th century in London